Edward Cochrane (January 1, 1834 – March 8, 1907) was a Canadian politician.

Born in Cramahe Township, Upper Canada, Cochrane educated in the village of Colborne. A farmer, he was for many years a School Trustee, Township Councillor, Deputy Reeve, Reeve and Warden of Northumberland and Durham. He was first elected to the House of Commons of Canada for the electoral district of Northumberland East in the general elections of 1882. A Conservative, he was defeated by 13 votes in 1887, but the election having been declared void for bribery by agents and he was elected on December 22 of same year. This election was also voided and he was again elected on November 21, 1888. He was re-elected in 1891, 1896, 1900 and 1904. He died while in office in 1907.

References
 
 The Canadian Parliament; biographical sketches and photo-engravures of the senators and members of the House of Commons of Canada. Being the tenth Parliament, elected November 3, 1904
 

1834 births
1907 deaths
Conservative Party of Canada (1867–1942) MPs
Members of the House of Commons of Canada from Ontario